Waterberg Plateau Park is a national park in central Namibia on the Waterberg Plateau,  south-east of Otjiwarongo. The plateau and the national park are named after the prominent table mountain that rises from the plateau, the Waterberg. The Waterberg Plateau is a particularly prominent location, elevating high above the plains of the Kalahari of Eastern Namibia. As the plateau is largely inaccessible from beneath several of Namibia's endangered species  were relocated in the early 1970s to protect them from predators and poaching to extinction. The programme was very successful and Waterberg now supplies other Namibian parks with rare animals. In 1989, the black rhinoceros was reintroduced to the area from Damaraland.

The Waterberg Plateau Park is ecologically diverse and rich and has over 200 different species of bird with some rare species of small antelope on the lower hills of the mountain. Geologically, the oldest rock stratum is over 850 million years old and dinosaurs tracks were left there some 200 million years ago.

The plateau was declared a National Monument in 1956.

Human habitation
 
The first human inhabitants were the San people, who left rock engravings believed to be several thousand years old. A small tribe of the San were still living their traditional lifestyle on the plateau until the late 1960s.

The foothills were the site of one of the major turning points in Namibia's history. In 1904, in the Battle of Waterberg, the Herero people lost their last and greatest battle against German Colonial forces in the Herero and Namaqua Wars. Subsequently, in the Herero and Namaqua Genocide, nearly two thirds of the Herero population lost their lives, and about one thousand could escape to British Bechuanaland (now Botswana), where they received asylum. The graves of German soldiers who lost their lives at Waterberg can still be viewed near the Bernabe De La Bat rest camp at the base of the park.

See also
National parks (Namibia)

References

External links 

 World Conservation Monitoring Centre (Archived)
 Waterberg Namibia

National Monuments of Namibia
National parks of Namibia
Protected areas established in 1972
1972 establishments in South West Africa
1972 establishments in South Africa